is a town located in Aichi District, Aichi Prefecture, Japan. , the town had an estimated population of 44,109 in 17,792 households, and a population density of 2,446 persons per km².

Geography
Tōgō is located in approximately the geographic center of Aichi Prefecture, immediately to the east of the Nagoya metropolis. The area is noted for a number of golf courses, including the Nagoya Golf Club's Wago Course, which hosts The Crowns golf tournament.

Neighboring municipalities
Aichi Prefecture
Nagoya – Midori-ku
Nisshin
Kariya
Toyoake
Miyoshi

Demographics
Per Japanese census data, the population of Tōgō has been increasing rapidly over the past 70 years.

Climate
The town has a climate characterized by characterized by hot and humid summers, and relatively mild winters (Köppen climate classification Cfa).  The average annual temperature in Tōgō is 15.7 °C. The average annual rainfall is 1593 mm with September as the wettest month. The temperatures are highest on average in August, at around 28.0 °C, and lowest in January, at around 4.2 °C.

History
The villages of Morowa and Haruki were established within Aichi District, Aichi with the establishment of the modern municipalities system on October 1, 1889. The town villages merged on May 10, 1906 to form the village of Tōgō. It was elevated to town status on April 1, 1970.

Economy
Tōgō is largely a regional commercial center with some light manufacturing industry. Due to its proximity to the Nagoya metropolis, it is increasingly becoming a commuter town.

Education
Tōgō has six public elementary schools and three public junior high schools operated by the town government and one public high school operated by the Aichi Prefectural Board of Education. The town also has on private high school.

Transportation

Railway
 Tōgō does not have any passenger railway service. The nearest train station is Komenoki Station on the Meitetsu Toyota Line in the neighboring city of Nisshin.

Highway

Local attractions

Kurozasa Nana-go-Kama Kiln
Yufuku-ji temple

Noted people from Tōgō
Stephanie Mawuli, basketball player
Jiro Sato, actor
Yoshi-Hashi, professional wrestler (Real Name: Nobuo Yoshihashi, Nihongo: 吉橋 伸雄, Yoshihashi Nobuo)

References

External links

 

 
Towns in Aichi Prefecture